Renmin Road Subdistrict  is a subdistrict situated in Meilan District, Haikou, Hainan, China. , it administers the following seven residential neighborhoods:
Yindian Community
Bulao Community
Bangdun Community
Lanhai Community
Xinli Community
Wanfu Community
Meilisha Community

See also
List of township-level divisions of Hainan

References

Township-level divisions in Haikou
Subdistricts of the People's Republic of China